Melitidae is a family of amphipods. It contains around 45 genera, and formerly included a further 40 genera that are now placed in the family Maeridae.

Genera

Abludomelita
Allomelita
Alsacomelita
Anchialella
Brachina
Caledopisa
Carinomelita
Cottarellia
Cottesloe
Desdimelita
Dulichiella
Eriopisa
Eriopisella
Gammarella
Hornellia
Indoniphargus
Jerbarnia
Josephosella
Maerella
Mallacoota
Megamoera
Melita
Metaceradocus
Netamelita
Nurina
Nuuanu
Parapherusa
Psammogammarus
Psammomelita
Rotomelita
Tabatzius
Tagua
Valettiella
Verdeia
Victoriopisa

References

Gammaridea
Crustacean families